Matthew Edwards (1882–1944) was an English footballer who played for Barnsley, Crystal Palace and Doncaster Rovers. Edwards played for Palace during their shock FA Cup win over Newcastle United in 1907.

References 

1882 births
1944 deaths
Footballers from South Shields
English footballers
English Football League players
Barnsley F.C. players
Crystal Palace F.C. players
Doncaster Rovers F.C. players
Southern Football League players
Association footballers not categorized by position